So Cold the River is a 2022 horror film that was written and directed by Paul Shoulberg. It is based on the novel by the same name by Michael Koryta.

Synopsis
Erica is a documentary filmmaker who gave up on her career after one of her prior subjects did something unspeakable. She's persuaded to once again return to this field by Alyssa, the daughter of dying and mysterious billionaire Campbell Bradford. She is tasked with profiling his life, including his ties to his hometown, but Erica is given few clues as to his past other than a bottle of water from a local spring. Erica travels to a resort he once frequented, where she discovers that Campbell is tied to a dark, disturbing history full of evil.

Cast
 Bethany Joy Lenz as Erica Shaw
 Alysia Reiner as Alyssa Bradford-Cohen
 Katie Sarife as Kellyn Cage
 Andrew J. West as Josiah Bradford
 Michael J Rogers as Campbell
 Deanna Dunagan as Anne McKinney
 Kevin Cahoon as Dylan
 Kingston Vernes as Lucas Granger
 Aaron Roman Weiner as Rory Granger

Production 
Filming for So Cold the River took place at the French Lick Resort and West Baden Springs Hotel in West Baden Springs, Orange County, Indiana.

Release
So Cold the River was given a limited theatrical release in the United States on March 25, 2022, followed by a VOD release the following week.

Reception
So Cold the River holds a rating of 58% on Rotten Tomatoes, based on 12 reviews, with an average rating of 6.6/10.

References

External links
 

2022 horror films
American horror films
2020s English-language films
2020s American films
Films shot in Indiana